The Bird Kiln is a historic pottery site in rural Dallas County, Arkansas. It is the site of a kiln which was set up in 1843 by William Bird, who established pottery as an industry in the area. Bird operated on the site until 1851, when he moved to another site north of Tulip. He and his brothers produced utilitarian salt glazed goods, and trained a whole generation of potters.

The site was listed on the National Register of Historic Places in 1975.

See also
National Register of Historic Places listings in Dallas County, Arkansas

References

Archaeological sites on the National Register of Historic Places in Arkansas
Buildings and structures in Dallas County, Arkansas
National Register of Historic Places in Dallas County, Arkansas